Hirad (also Romanized as Hīrad and Hīrod; also known as Hūrāid and Hūrīd) is a village in Meyghan Rural District, in the Central District of Nehbandan County, South Khorasan Province, Iran. At the 2006 census, its population was 95, in 27 families.

References 

Populated places in Nehbandan County